The Asháninka or Asháninca are an indigenous people living in the rainforests of Peru and in the State of Acre, Brazil. Their ancestral lands are in the forests of Junín, Pasco, Huánuco and part of Ucayali in Peru.

Population

The Asháninka are estimated between 25,000 and 100,000, although others give 88,000 to almost 100,000.  Only little more than a thousand of them live on the Brazilian side of the border. The Ashaninka communities are scattered throughout the central rainforests of Peru in the Provinces of Junin, Pasco, Huanuco, a part of Ucayali, and the Brazilian state of Acre.

Subsistence
The Asháninka are mostly dependent on subsistence agriculture. They use the slash-and-burn method to clear lands and to plant yucca roots, sweet potato, corn, bananas, rice, coffee, cacao and sugar cane in biodiversity-friendly techniques. They live from hunting and fishing, primarily using bows and arrows or spears, as well as from collecting fruit and vegetables in the jungle.

History

The Asháninka were known by the Incas as Anti or Campa. The Antis, who gave their name to the Inca province of Antisuyu, were notorious for their fierce independence, and their warlike skills in successfully protecting their land and culture against intrusion from outsiders.

Ashanínka tribal societies have faced overwhelming obstacles in disputes over territory and culture against the immigrating Spanish culture and neighboring tribal societies. Biodiversity is the establishment of the Ashanínka way of life, so they treat this biodiversity hotspot as their natural capital. In AD 1542, the European settlers pushed to overtake the natural resources. In June 2010, however, the Brazilian and Peruvian governments signed an energy agreement that allows Brazilian companies to build a series of large dams in the Brazilian, Peruvian, and Bolivian Amazon. The problem with the 2,000-megawatt Pakitzapango Dam is that it has a permanent location that is proposed to be located in the heart of Peru's Ene valley and could displace as many as 10,000 Ashanínka. These encroaching problems have not only extremely changed the generational culture of the Ashanínka tribal societies, but has also changed landscape of what we call modern-day Peru.

Demography

In Peru 
In Peru, the Ashaninkas lived dispersed in a vast territory that included the valleys of the Apurímac, Ene, Tambo, Perené, Pichis rivers, a sector of the Alto Ucayali and the interfluvial zone of the Gran Pajonal, organized into small residential groups made up of around five nuclear families under the direction of a local chief or Kuraka. The rivers where the Ashaninka are settled and where they can be found are the Lower Apurímac, Ene, Tambo, Satipo, Pichis, Lower Urubamba, Upper Ucayali, Pachitea and Yurúa, as well as their main tributaries. Due to migrations, whether due to political violence or interest in the extraction of forest resources, they have mobilized and shared territories with other ethnic groups, such as in the Lower Urubamba, where they share space with the Machiguenga.

In Brazil 
The Asháninka in Brazilian territory add up to more than 1,000 inhabitants. Known as Kampas in Brazil and also as Campas in Peru (pejorative term), they are distributed in small towns along the Breu, Amônia, and Arara rivers, tributaries of the Envira and Yurúa rivers, in the state of Acre. Its population was estimated at 689 people according to data from the CEDI of 1991.

It is very probable that the presence of Asháninka in Brazil is due to the action of the mine owners who forced them to move from Gran Pajonal. The presence of Asháninkas in Brazilian territory, actually, goes back to the eighteenth century.

Traditional dress

The Asháninka traditional dress, commonly known as a kushma, is a robe made from cotton that is collected, spun, dyed and woven by women on looms. Typically the robes are dyed either brown or a bright royal blue. The shoulders of the garments are ornamented with seeds. A full length robe can take up to three months to complete.

Traditionally, women wear their hair long, and over the shoulder, while typically men wear their hair short or in "bowl" cuts below the ear.  Around their necks they wear a large variety of necklaces and bracelets made with seeds, the teeth of tapir, peccary and monkeys, and brightly colored feathers.

Traditionally the Asháninka men, women and children paint their faces in a variety of designs using the bright red crushed seeds of Achiote (Bixa orellana) (annatto) fruits. For ceremonial purposes, the men also wear woven circles of palm leaves decorated with feathers on their heads, and the women wear a woven cotton head dress.

Language 
The Asháninka language belongs to the Arawak linguistic family, as do the Matsiguenga, Yine, Caquinte, Yanesha and Nomatsiguenga languages. In Peru it is spoken by approximately 25,000 Asháninka.

The Asháninka language is spoken in the central eastern territory of Peru, in the departments of Cusco, Junín, Pasco, Huánuco and Ucayali. Such a wide distribution certainly offers multiple dialectal varieties.

Threats
The Asháninka are known historically to be fiercely independent, and were noted for their "bravery and independence" by the Spanish conquistadors. They resisted with some success missionary endeavors by Roman Catholic missionaries from the 17th to 19th centuries, especially near the Cerro de la Sal (Salt Mountain) and the Gran Pajonal (Great Grassland) in the central part of the Amazon basin in Peru. During the rubber boom (1839–1913), the Asháninka were enslaved by rubber tappers and an estimated 70% of the Asháninka population was killed.

For over a century, there has been encroachment onto Asháninka land from rubber tappers, loggers, Maoist guerrillas, drug traffickers, colonists, and oil companies.

During the 1980s and 90s, the Asháninka suffered forced conscription, forced labour and massacres at the hands of the Sendero Luminoso and the MRTA. Of the 55,000 Asháninka in Junín, around 6000 were killed, 10,000 were displaced, and 5000 imprisoned in camps of the Sendero Luminoso. About 30 to 40 Asháninka villages were obliterated.

Malaria is on the rise in Asháninka communities. Current threats (either directly or indirectly) are from oil companies, drug traffickers, colonists, illegal lumberers, illegal roads, and diseases brought by outsiders. In 1988 a program started in Peru to teach Spanish language to indigenous people.

See also 
Asháninka language
2009 Peruvian political crisis

References

Indigenous peoples of the Amazon
Ethnic groups in Peru
Ethnic groups in Brazil
Indigenous peoples in Peru
Indigenous peoples in Brazil

External Links 
 El Ojo verde - Cosmovisiones amazónicas
 Parks Watch - Reserva Comunal Asháninka de Satipo